Effie O'Neal Ellis (June 15, 1913 – July 5, 1994) was an American pediatrician, child medical care consultant, and an activist for infant health and maternal education.  Ellis was the first African American woman to hold an executive position in the American Medical Association.  In 1989, Ellis was inducted to the Chicago Women's Hall of Fame for her efforts in improving the lives of the black community and helping to lower infant mortality rates.

Early life and education 
Ellis was born in Hawkinsville, Georgia, Georgia to Joshua P. O'Neal and Althea (Hamilton) O'Neal. In 1933, she obtained her bachelor's degree in Biology and Chemistry upon graduating from Spelman College. Ellis then attended graduate school at Atlanta University where she acquired a master's degree in biology in 1935. In 1950 Ellis graduated from University of Illinois College of Medicine where she graduated with honors and fifth in her class.

Career and accomplishments 
Following graduate school, she was presented with a grant to study diseases and parasites in Puerto Rico, which prompted her passion for healthcare for all socioeconomic backgrounds. Ellis served as a pediatric residency at Massachusetts General Hospital from 1951-1952. Her primary concerns were with the black community, children, and child mortality rates. She aided in the development of parenting and education programs for the March of Dimes. She dedicated much of her treating and advising to new and expecting mothers.

Ellis obtained a postdoctoral fellowship studying pediatric cardiology at Johns Hopkins University School of Medicine from July 1, 1952 to June 30, 1953. She was a specialist in maternal, prenatal, postnatal, and preventative health care. Her team helped to develop the technique to help save blue babies (those infants with inadequate oxygen supply). In 1970 Ellis became the first African American woman to hold an executive position in the American Medical Association, which she held for five years. She became a Director of Maternal Care and Health Care for Ohio's Department of Health in 1960. In 1970, Ellis was appointed to the President's Committee on the Handicapped. Ellis was inducted the Chicago Women's Hall of Fame in 1989.

Personal life and death 
Ellis married to Arthur. W. Ellis in 1935 and later married James D. Solomon on March 23, 1953.  She died in Northwestern Memorial Hospital on July 5, 1994.

References 

1913 births
1994 deaths
African-American educators
African-American physicians
20th-century American women physicians
20th-century American physicians
American pediatricians
Women pediatricians
University of Illinois alumni
20th-century African-American women
20th-century African-American people
20th-century American people
Members of the National Academy of Medicine